Artur Paulo Assunção Vaz (3 April 1925 – 30 July 2009) was a Portuguese footballer who played as defender.

Artur Vaz gained 3 caps for Portugal and made his debut 21 November 1953 in Lisbon against South Africa in a 3-1 win.

External links 
 
 

1925 births
2009 deaths
Portuguese footballers
Association football defenders
Primeira Liga players
Vitória F.C. players
Portugal international footballers